Expansive clay is a clay soil that is prone to large volume changes (swelling and shrinking) that are directly related to changes in water content. Soils with a high content of expansive minerals can form deep cracks in drier seasons or years; such soils are called vertisols. Soils with smectite clay minerals, including montmorillonite and bentonite, have the most dramatic shrink-swell capacity.

The mineral make-up of this type of soil is responsible for the moisture retaining capabilities. All clays consist of mineral sheets packaged into layers, and can be classified as either 1:1 or 2:1. These ratios refer to the proportion of tetrahedral sheets to octahedral sheets. Octahedral sheets are sandwiched between two tetrahedral sheets in 2:1 clays, while 1:1 clays have sheets in matched pairs. Expansive clays have an expanding crystal lattice in a 2:1 ratio; however, there are 2:1 non-expansive clays.

Mitigation of the effects of expansive clay on structures built in areas with expansive clays is a major challenge in geotechnical engineering. Some areas mitigate foundation cracking by watering around the foundation with a soaker hose during dry conditions. This process can be automated by a timer, or using a soil moisture sensor controller. Even though irrigation is expensive, the cost is small compared to repairing a cracked foundation. Admixtures can be added to expansive clays to reduce the shrink-swell properties, as well.

One laboratory test to measure the expansion potential of soil is ASTM D 4829.

See also
Argillipedoturbation
Dispersion (soil)

References

Types of soil
Soil mechanics
Soil physics
Sediments